The 1894 Nova Scotia general election was held from 8 March to 15 March 1894 to elect members of the 31st House of Assembly of the Province of Nova Scotia, Canada. It was won by the Liberal party.

Results

Results by party

Retiring incumbents
Liberal
George Clarke, Colchester
Daniel McNeil, Inverness
Henry M. Munro, Annapolis

Liberal-Conservative
Alexander F. Cameron, Guysborough
Thomas Barlow Smith, Hants

Nominated candidates
1894 Nova Scotia Provincial Election

Legend
bold denotes party leader
† denotes an incumbent who is not running for re-election or was defeated in nomination contest

Valley

|-
| rowspan="2"|Annapolis
||
|James Wilberforce Longley1,80827.18%	
|
|Thomas R. Jones1,55523.38%	
|
|
||
|James Wilberforce Longley
|-
||
|Joseph A. Bancroft1,79326.95%	
|
|Hugh E. Gillis1,49622.49%	
|
|
||
|Henry M. Munro†
|-
| rowspan="2"|Digby
||
|Ambroise-Hilaire Comeau1,22827.54%
|
|Louis Dugan1,01822.83%	
|
|
||
|Ambroise-Hilaire Comeau
|-
||
|Eliakim Tupper1,24527.92%	
|
|M. R. Timpany96821.71%	
|
|
||
|Eliakim Tupper
|-
| rowspan="2"|Hants
||
|Arthur Drysdale1,70625.19%
|
|James A. Thompson1,68924.94%		
|
|
||
|Arthur Drysdale
|-	
|
|W. H. Guild1,64424.28%	
||
|Charles Smith Wilcox1,73325.59%
|
|
||
|Thomas Barlow Smith†
|-
| rowspan="2"|Kings
||
|Brenton Dodge2,22731.%	
|
|Barclay Webster1,58021.99%	
|
|
||
|Barclay Webster
|-
||
|Harry H. Wickwire2,08128.97%	
|
|R. M. Rand1,29618.04%	
|
|
||
|Vacant
|-
|}

South Shore

|-
| rowspan="2"|Lunenburg
||
|John Drew Sperry2,64827.92%	
|
|James A. McLean2,13322.49%	
|
|
||
|John Drew Sperry
|-
||
|Charles Edward Church2,60227.44%	
|
|J. A. Hirtle2,10122.15%	
|
|
||
|Charles Edward Church
|-
| rowspan="2"|Queens
||
|Albert M. Hemeon91328.83%	
|
|John Hutt70322.20%	
|
|
||
|Albert M. Hemeon
|-
||
|Richard Hunt91228.79%	
|
|O.L. Patch63920.18%	
|
|
||
|Richard Hunt
|-
| rowspan="2"|Shelburne
||
|Thomas Johnston1,28226.31%	
|
|R. W. Freeman1,05921.74%
|
|
||
|Thomas Johnston
|-
||
|Thomas Robertson1,31927.07%
|
|Charles Cahan1,21224.88%	
|
|
||
|Charles Cahan
|-
| rowspan="2"|Yarmouth
||
|William Law1,46431.78%
|
|
|
|E.C. Simonson (Prohibitionist-Temperance)89919.51%
||
|William Law
|-	
|
|Cornelius Forman Hatfield1,09723.81%
||
|Albert A. Pothier1,14724.90%	
|
|
||
|Cornelius Forman Hatfield
|-
|}

Fundy-Northeast

|-
| rowspan="2"|Colchester
||
|Frederick Andrew Laurence1,89625.09%
|
|Israel Longworth1,89025.02%
|
|
||
|Frederick Andrew Laurence
|-	
|
|Alfred Dickie1,81424.01%	
||
|Wilbert David Dimock1,95525.88%	
|
|
||
|George Clarke†
|-
| rowspan="2"|Cumberland
||
|Thomas Reuben Black3,10928.47%	
|
|George W. Forrest2,49822.87%	
|
|
||
|George W. Forrest
|-
||
|Alexander E. Fraser2,90226.58%	
|
|William Oxley2,41122.08%	
|
|
||
|William Oxley
|-
|}

Halifax

|-
| rowspan="3"|Halifax
||
|William Stevens Fielding4,79517.88%
|
|T. W. Walsh4,01914.99%
|
|
||
|William Stevens Fielding
|-
||
|William Roche4,65117.35%	
|
|James Morrow4,40616.43%	
|
|
||
|William Roche
|-	
|
|Michael Joseph Power4,37316.31%	
||
|William Anderson Black4,57017.04%	
|
|
||
|Michael Joseph Power
|-
|}

Central Nova

|-
| rowspan="2"|Antigonish
||
|Colin Francis McIsaac1,33327.99%	
|
|J.J. Cameron1,14123.95%	
|
|
||
|Colin Francis McIsaac
|-
||
|Christopher P. Chisholm1,22525.72%	
|
|C. Ernest Gregory1,06422.34%	
|
|
||
|Christopher P. Chisholm
|-
| rowspan="2"|Guysborough
||
|Daniel H. McKinnon1,24028.70%	
|
|Hamilton Morrow97922.66%	
|
|
||
|Hamilton Morrow
|-
||
|John Howard Sinclair1,21628.15%	
|
|A. Whitman88520.49%	
|
|
||
|Alexander F. Cameron†
|-
| rowspan="3"|Pictou	
|
|Edward Mortimer Macdonald2,79715.41%
||
|William Cameron3,25417.93%	
|
|
||
|William Cameron
|-	
|
|James Drummond McGregor2,99216.49%
||
|Charles Elliott Tanner3,23617.83%	
|
|
||
|James Drummond McGregor
|-	
|
|J. F. Oliver2,75915.20%
||
|Alexander Grant3,10917.13%	
|
|
||
|Alexander Grant
|-
|}

Cape Breton

|-
| rowspan="2"|Cape Breton	
|
|Joseph McPherson2,59223.89%
||
|William MacKay2,88526.59%	
|
|
||
|Joseph McPherson
|-	
|
|Angus J. MacDonald2,55223.52%
||
|John McCormick2,82226.01%	
|
|
||
|Angus J. MacDonald
|-
| rowspan="2"|Inverness	
|
|John McKinnon1,74624.87%
||
|John H. Jameison1,85726.45%	
|
|
||
|John McKinnon
|-	
|
|Samuel McDonnell1,65823.61%
||
|Alexander Campbell1,76025.07%	
|
|
||
|Daniel McNeil†
|-
| rowspan="2"|Richmond
||
|Simon Joyce99625.89%
|
|Abraham LeBlanc88322.95%
|
|
||
|Abraham LeBlanc
|-	
|
|Joseph Matheson97425.32%	
|
|John Morrison99425.84%
|
|
||
|Joseph Matheson
|-
| rowspan="3"|Victoria
||
|John Gillis Morrison78424.39%
|
|John J. McCabe59718.57%
|
|
||
|John A. Fraser
|-	
|
|John A. Fraser74823.27%	
|rowspan=2 |
|rowspan=2|John Lemuel Bethune91128.34%	
|rowspan=2|
|rowspan=2|
|rowspan=2 |
|rowspan=2|John Lemuel Bethune
|-
|
|M. H. MacKenzie1745.41%
|-
|}

References

1894
1894 elections in Canada
1894 in Nova Scotia
March 1894 events